{{DISPLAYTITLE:C2H2}}
C2H2 may mean:

Molecular formulae 

The molecular formula C2H2 (molar mass: 26.04 g/mol, exact mass: 26.01565 u) may refer to:

 Acetylene (or ethyne)
 Methylidenecarbene
 Vinylidene group

Transcription factors 

 C2H2 zinc finger, short for Cys2His2 a class of transcription factors with the small protein structural motif stabilised with Zinc ions